Salina is one of the Aeolian Islands north of Sicily, southern Italy. It is the second largest island in the archipelago.

Salina is divided between three comuni: Santa Marina on the eastern coast, Malfa to the north, and Leni to the south-west. From Leni down towards the sea is the village of Rinella.  Above the village of Leni is Valdichiesa in the center of the island. The other smaller villages are Capo Faro, Pollara and Lingua.

There are currently approximately 2,600 residents living on the island.

Geography
It is included on the World Heritage List especially because of its worth for vulcanology. A lower crater lies just above sea level near the small village of Pollara, on the north west corner of the island, half of which has fallen into the sea.

The most recent eruption on Salina occurred on the western part of the island about 13,000 years ago and formed the semi-circular crater of Pollara; its activity was mainly explosive and produced large pumice deposits.

All that remains of the endogenic activities are some post-volcanic phenomena called “gurgling” and a thermal spring at Pertuso. The gurgling phenomena are at Rinella and are basically caused by the emission of underwater gas (hydrogen sulphate) and vapours. When this phenomenon is at its most active it can lift the sea-bed.

Vegetation
From a distance Salina looks entirely green with two rounded high mountains and a smooth coastline. More than 400 different types of plants grow on the island and grapes, olives and capers are cultivated.

Salina was the first among the Aeolian islands to protect its environment with a natural preserve, known as the Riserva Naturale del Fossa delle Felci e dei Porri.

The mountainsides of the island are covered with ferns, poplars, chestnut trees and typical Mediterranean vegetation including with caper bushes, prickly pear cactus. and a variety of orchards, olive groves and vineyards. The island is particularly notable for  Malvasia, a famous white wine that is only produced on Salina. It is golden in colour and has an intense, delicately sweet bouquet. There has also been a local revival of the production of superior-quality low-acid olive oil.

It is claimed that Salina produces the best capers in the world and during the first weekend of June there is an annual caper festival.

History
A Greek settlement, from the fourth century BC through to the times of Imperial Rome, once lay on the modern-day site of the small town of Santa Marina. A number of tombs from this era have been discovered further inland. Several traces of Greek and Roman culture have been found on the island.

In the Hellenic Age the island was named "Didyme" (Δίδυμη), a Greek name which refers to the two mountains as "twins". The island was inhabited as far back as the  Bronze Age and has been developed and then abandoned many times over the subsequent millennia.

Areas on the island, including the two mountain peaks, were designated as a natural reserve in 1981.

Main sights
The salt lake in Lingua was once a site for production of sea salt, hence the name Salina ("salt mill" in Italian).
On the slopes of the Fossa, several Roman tombs have been excavated.
The religious centre of Salina, it attracts pilgrims on the main feast day of July 23 every year.
Santa Marina Salina is the most lively part of the island. This commune is where many visitors are first dropped off and contains a boutiques and specialty shops.

In the 18th century the ruins of a typical Imperial Roman villa were noted here but have since sunk into the ground.

Transportation
Salina has two ports, Santa Marina and Rinella, served by ferries and hydrofoils. Hydrofoil service is active from Naples, Palermo, Reggio Calabria, Messina and Milazzo.

There is a regular bus service connecting all the villages on the island. A main road connects Lingua, Santa Marina, Malfa and Pollara; a side road runs between the two volcanoes to Leni and Rinella.

Culture
The 1994  Michael Radford film Il Postino: The Postman, casting Messinese actress Maria Grazia Cucinotta, was filmed on the island of Procida and on Salina.

Salina is also a setting in the novel sequence , by Timothée de Fombelle.

See also
List of volcanoes in Italy
 List of islands of Italy

References

Other sources

External links
  Love Salina: new, official Salina tourism web portal. (Italian, English, German, Spanish)

Aeolian Islands
Former municipalities of Sicily
Volcanoes of Italy